This is a list of plants that have been domesticated by humans. The list includes individual plant species identified by their common names as well as larger formal and informal botanical categories which include at least some domesticated individuals. Plants in this list are grouped by the original or primary purpose for which they were domesticated, and subsequently by botanical or culinary categories. Plants with more than one significant human use may be listed in multiple categories.

Plants are considered domesticated when their life cycle, behavior, or appearance has been significantly altered as a result of being under artificial selection by humans for multiple generations (see the main article on domestication for more information). Thousands of distinct plant species have been domesticated throughout human history. Not all modern domesticated plant varieties can be found growing in the wild; many are actually hybrids of two or more naturally occurring species and therefore have no wild counterpart.

Food and cooking

Fruit trees

Pomes

 Apple (Malus domestica)
 Asian pear
 Loquat (Japanese medlar)
 Common medlar
 Pear
 Quince

Citrus fruits

 Citron
 Grapefruit
 Lemon
 Lime
 Orange
 Pomelo

Nut trees

 Almond
 Cashew
 Chestnut
 Hazelnut
 Macadamia
 Pecan (Carya illinoinensis)
 Pistachio
 Walnut

Other
Numerous other trees have been domesticated for their fruits. There are more than 100 known domesticated plant species native to the Amazon alone.
 Açaí palm (Euterpe oleracea)
 American-oil palm
 Apricot
 Babacu
 Banana (Musa spp.)
 Breadfruit
 Calabash
 Cherry
 Cocopalm
 Durian (Durio spp.)
 Ensete
 Fig
 Ice-cream bean
 Jackfruit
 Mango
 Panama-hat palm
 Papaya (Carica papaya)
 Passionfruit
 Peach and Nectarine
 Peach palm (Bactris gasipaes)
 Plum
 Sapodilla
 Tucuma

Cereals

 Barley
 Finger millet
 Fonio
 Foxtail millet
 Little barley (Hordeum pusillum, central US pre-Columbian)
 Maize (called corn in the U.S.)
 Maygrass (Phalaris caroliniana, central US pre-Columbian)
 Pearl millet
 Proso millet
 Oats
 Rice
 Rye
 Sorghum
 Spelt
 Teff (also tef)
 Triticale (Secalotriticum spp.) – a hybrid between wheat and rye
 Wheat 
 Bread wheat (Triticum aestivum)
 Pasta or Durum wheat (Triticum durum)
 Einkorn wheat (Triticum monococcum)

Pseudocereals
 Amaranth
 Buckwheat
 Job's tears
 Knotweed bristlegrass (erect knotweed, New World)
 Pitseed goosefoot (Chenopodium berlandieri, central US pre-Columbian)
 Quinoa
 Sunflower (Helianthus annuus)
 Marshelder (sumpweed, Iva annua, central US pre-Columbian)

Legumes

 Beans – eaten dry as pulses or fresh as vegetables
 Azuki bean (Vigna angularis)
 Black-eyed pea (Vigna unguiculata)
 Chickpea (Cicer arietinum)
 Common bean (Phaseolus spp., including pinto bean, kidney bean, runner bean, Lima bean, and others)
 Lentil (Lens culinaris)
 Velvet bean (Mucuna pruriens)
 Moth bean -(Vigna aconitifolia)
 Mung bean (Vigna radiata)
 Pea (Pisum sativum)
 Peanut (Arachis hypogaea) – botanically a legume, but often referred to as a culinary nut
 Jicama (Pachyrhizus erosus) – the most valuable edible part of the plant is the tuberous root rather than the bean

Sweet small-plant fruits

Aggregated drupelet "berries"

 Raspberry
 Blackberry

True berries

 Blueberry
 Cranberry
 Huckleberry

Other
 Currant
 Grape
 Melon (several species)
 Pineapple
 Strawberry
 Avocado

Vegetables

Non-sweet small-plant fruits
 Eggplant (aubergine)
 Okra
 Peppers
 Squash (e.g., Cucurbita pepo, multiple varieties)
 Winter squash
 Pumpkin
 Summer squash
 Zucchini
 Gourds
 Tomato

Root vegetables

 Non-starchy
 Beet
 Carrot
 Parsnip
 Radish
 Turnip
 Starchy
 Cassava (manioc, yuca) (requires special processing to be edible)
 Potato
 Sweet potato
 Taro (requires special processing to be edible)
 Yam

Herbs and spices

 Allspice
 Basil
 Cinnamon
 Coriander (also called cilantro)
 Cumin (Cuminum cyminum)
 Jasmine (Jasminum spp.)
 Lemongrass (Cymbopogon spp.)
 Nutmeg (Myristica fragrans)
 Oregano (Origanum vulgare)
 Parsley (Petroselinum crispum)
 Peppermint
 Rosemary (Salvia rosmarinus)
 Saffron (Crocus sativus)
 Spearmint
 Thyme (Thymus vulgaris)
 Wintergreen

Oil-producing plants

 Olive (also eaten directly in many parts of the world)

Legumes grown principally for oil production:
 Peanut (also eaten directly in the United States)
 Soybean (also a major livestock feed and export crop, and sometimes eaten directly as a snack food)

Commodities
Plants grown principally as animal fodder or for soil enrichment:
 Alfalfa
 Clover
 Many grasses are grown for hay and silage

Oil-producing plants (for fuel or lubrication):
 Canola (rapeseed)
 Olive

Utility plants:
 Bottle gourd (used for containers)

Psychoactive plants (for drugs or medicines):
 Belladonna
 Cannabis (Cannabis spp.)
 Chocolate (Theobroma cacao)
 Coffee (Coffea arabica)
 Cola
 Opium poppy (Papaver somniferum)
 Quinine
 Tea (Camellia sinensis)
 Tobacco

Fiber plants (for textiles):
 Cannabis (hemp)
 Cotton
 Flax
 Henequen (sisal, henequin, etc.)
 Jute
 Kenaf
 Manila hemp

Ornamental plants
 Houseplants
 Landscaping (see List of garden plants)

References
Heiser, C. B. (1990). Seed to civilization: the story of food. Harvard University Press, Cambridge, Massachusetts
Simpson, B.B.; Conner-Ogorzaly, M. (2000). Economic botany: plants in our world. McGraw-Hill Higher Education.
Vaughan, J. G.; C. A. Geissler (1997). The new Oxford book of food plants. Oxford University Press, Oxford.

See also
 Botany
 Agriculture
 Crop wild relative
 Wild type
 Genomics of domestication
 Horticulture
 List of domesticated animals
 List of domesticated fungi and microorganisms
 List of useful plants
 List of poisonous plants

 
Domesticated plants
Domesticated